Thomas E. Flaherty (born June 18, 1950) is a former Democratic member of the Pennsylvania House of Representatives.
He currently a judge on the Allegheny County Court of Common Pleas, having won election to this position in 2005.

References

Democratic Party members of the Pennsylvania House of Representatives
Pittsburgh City Council members
Living people
1950 births
Central Catholic High School (Pittsburgh) alumni